The National Consumers League, founded in 1899, is an American consumer organization. The National Consumers League is a private, nonprofit advocacy group representing consumers on marketplace and workplace issues. The NCL provides government, businesses, and other organizations with the consumer's perspective on concerns including child labor, privacy, food safety, and medication information.

The organization was chartered in 1899 by social reformers Jane Addams and Josephine Lowell. Its first general secretary was Florence Kelley. Under Kelley's direction, the League's early focus was to oppose the harsh, unregulated working conditions many Americans were forced to endure. The founding principles of the NCL are: "That the working conditions we accept for our fellow citizens should be reflected by our purchases, and that consumers should demand safety and reliability from the goods and services they buy." The league's focus continues to be to promote a fair marketplace for workers and consumers.

Goals 
The NCL based their organization on the ideals of consumer citizenship, in which it is a citizens duty to advocate for government legislation and use their individual purchasing power to shape a more ethical consumer market. For many years the majority of the members were middle or upper class women who worked primarily in cross-class activism using their power as consumers to protect those in their community who had fewer resources and whose voices carried less social currency. They pushed for better working conditions and a higher standard of available products for the purchaser. The league used tools such as investigating and educating to promote change. League members would often do thorough investigations in order to study the relevant social problems within their community. They would then create a report and present it to other women and community members often through public events, women's talk clubs, or fairs.  In its early years it would award a company or producer with a "White Label" which signified that the league was in approval of their ethicality and it would be recognized by other informed consumers. As they progressed they turned their attention more toward implementing legislation that would provide protection to exploited workers and consumers. In the 1970s they shifted their focus onto the well being of consumers as individuals rather than the focus on working conditions.

Prominent Members

Florence Kelley
In founding the National Consumers League in 1899, one of Kelley's primary concerns was that the league oppose sweatshop labor. Kelley also worked to establish a work-day limited to eight hours. She worked in support of unionization to further protect workers. In 1907 she participated in the Supreme Court case Muller v. Oregon, which sought to overturn limits to the hours female workers could work in non-hazardous professions. Kelley helped to file the Brandeis Brief, which included sociological and medical evidence of the hazards of working long hours, and set the precedent of the Supreme Court's recognition of sociological evidence, which was used to great effect later in the case Brown v. Board of Education. In addition, Kelley assisted in organizing the National Association For Advancement of Colored People.

Esther Peterson
Esther Peterson's involvement in the NCL played an important role in consumer politics and worked within government office as well as the consumer market itself. She was a long time member of the NCL having worked with them as early as 1944 and served as the organizations president from 1974-1976. Peterson worked with the White House as a Special Assistant on Consumer Affairs from 1964-70 during Lyndon B.Johnson's presidency. She carried on her position as director of the Office of Consumer Affairs until 1981. Peterson was also a consumer advisor for the supermarket chain, Giant, from 1970-1976. Peterson also worked closely with president Jimmy Carter's office to represent consumers in policy making. Peterson dedicated her work to consumer protections like accurate food labeling and advocated for protections regarding class, race, and gender in the workforce and consumer market. Peterson made efforts to improve the market in ways that would benefit both business and consumer.

Eras of Activism

New Deal Era
In the 1920s and 1930's the NCL focus was set on lobbying for a gendered-minimum wage. As the U.S. entered the depression they began to lobby for both male and female working conditions and contributed to the passing of the Fair Labor Standards Act of 1938 which is one of their first legislative achievements that set a standard for working conditions and outlawed child labor. In addition they fought for the use of the codes for fair competition through pressuring the National Recovery Administration. The NCL experienced some opposition through the New Deal Era from the National Women's Party over differing beliefs of gendered-wages.

Current leadership
Sally Greenberg, formerly a senior attorney at Consumers Union (CU), is the executive director of the National Consumers League. Greenberg has worked with members of Congress, the National Highway Traffic Safety Administration, other federal agencies, the media and consumer safety organizations to shape policy on such issues as product safety, auto safety, and legal and liability reform.

Programs
LifeSmarts (www.LifeSmarts.org) is a free program designed to teach teenagers consumer rights and responsibilities as they pertain to health, finance, technology, and the environment.

Fraud.org is a reporting platform through which the National Consumers League collects information about scams, extracts trends from data, and forwards reports to law enforcement.

The Child Labor Coalition (www.StopChildLabor.org) was formed in 1989 to combat child labor and protect teen workers from health and safety hazards. It is co-chaired by the National Consumers League and the American Federation of Teachers.

Script Your Future (www.ScriptYourFuture.org) is a public awareness initiative which teaches patients undergoing long-term prescription therapy the importance of communicating with healthcare professionals and following regimens carefully.

See also
 Antitrust
 Better Business Bureau
 Class action
 Consumer complaint
 Mabel Cory Costigan, vice president and lobbyist for NCL in the 20th century
 Fairtrade certification
 Mandatory labelling
 Planned obsolescence
 Product recall
 Unfair competition

References

Further reading
 Josephine Goldmark, et al. "The Work of the National Consumers' League. During the Year Ending March 1, 1910", Annals of the American Academy of Political and Social Science, Vol. 36, Supplement (Sept. 1910) pp. 1–75 , primary source

External links
 National Consumers League - official website
 National Consumers' League Records.Schlesinger Library , Radcliffe Institute, Harvard University.

1899 establishments in the United States
Organizations established in 1899
Child labor in the United States
Consumer organizations in the United States